Butcher Creek is a stream in the U.S. state of South Dakota.

Butcher Creek received its name from a skirmish between Indians in which a warrior was "butchered up".

See also
List of rivers of South Dakota

References

Rivers of Meade County, South Dakota
Rivers of Ziebach County, South Dakota
Rivers of South Dakota